"The Trial of Superman!"  was a multi-title American comic book crossover story arc released by DC Comics in the various Superman titles from between November 1995 and January 1996.

Plot
Weakened after a titanic battle with the Parasite II (Rudolph "Rudy" Jones in a more monstrous form than before, and with the addition of Dr. Torval Freeman's mind), Superman inexplicably finds himself shackled in chains and under arrest by a group of intergalactic law enforcement officers under the command of the Tribunal, an intergalactic court dedicated to justice in all of its many forms. Taken to another galaxy, Superman briefly escapes and regains the energy and his superpowers that were stolen from him by the Parasite II, but he is recaptured and has his superpowers negated by a device called a Geneti-Lock. He is then put on trial by the Tribunal, which is made up of three large, blue-skinned aliens, with their leader named the Tribunal Prime and the other two named Pollux and Ternion. Having already discovered that one of his relatives contributed to the destruction of the planet Krypton and the annihilation of the Kryptonian race, Superman is found guilty of the crime by reason of ancestry and sentenced to death.

With his superpowers suppressed, Superman finds himself incarcerated with criminals from all over the universe. He allies with a few of them to escape; one of which is named Mope-Stattor Neer, a frail humanoid from the planet Thwire with the ability to adopt a faux-muscular appearance by inflating his muscles. Superman and his cohorts are then hunted across the galaxy; in the meantime, Superboy (Kon-El a.k.a. Conner Kent), Supergirl (the Matrix), Steel III (John Henry Irons), the Eradicator III (David Connor) and the Alpha Centurion B (Marcus Aelius) team up as the "Superman Rescue Squad" to search for Superman after his disappearance. They are captured by the Tribunal, however, after discovering that the Cyborg Superman I (Henry "Hank" Henshaw) is now in the employ of the Tribunal Prime.

After encountering and fighting the Cyborg himself, Superman is recaptured again and brought back to the Tribunal; his execution is then brought forward. The Tribunal Prime (who is, by now, insane with power) plans to enact a fitting punishment for Superman; strapping him to a rocket and firing him into the green kryptonite cloud located where Krypton used to be. The Cyborg, however, has plans of his own; while Superman's sentencing is taking place, he starts to assimilate the technology of the Tribunal's planet in an attempt to create a new Warworld. Superman's friends attempt to stop the Cyborg, but are distractions at best and ineffective at worst; Superman frees himself from the rocket and returns to defeat the Cyborg by forcibly disconnecting his main body from the planet.

Despite saving the Tribunal's planet from the Cyborg, the Tribunal Prime still stands by Superman's execution order. Superman refutes them in a speech that, while not convincing the Tribunal Prime, shakes Pollux and Ternion's resolve to the core. He and the Superman Rescue Squad turn to depart, but Superman then realizes that he has left Mope behind, who would be executed anyway, despite his pleas of innocence. Superman returns for Mope alone, but he is confronted once again by the Cyborg, now possessed by the Tribunal Prime using a jewel with mind control powers. Superman is defeated again and is strapped to a backup rocket for his execution.

Despite the best efforts of Superman's friends, the rocket is launched; however, Superman's actions throughout the whole incident have inspired Mope to sacrifice his life in order to save Superman's life by taking Superman's place on the rocket (he does this by using his inflatable muscles in order to appear similar in appearance to Superman) before anyone even notices what is going on. Mope, who then reveals that he actually was guilty of the crimes that he was charged with, is launched into the green kryptonite cloud instead and dies, despite Superman's attempts to rescue him.

After this, believing Superman to be dead, the Tribunal then turn to the Cyborg, whom they are interrogating and torturing in order to get a confession out of him: admission of his guilt for the destruction of Coast City and its inhabitants. The Tribunal Prime orders that he be tortured even more upon hearing this confession; Pollux is struck by the Tribunal Prime when he disagrees with him. Right after this, Superman and the Superman Rescue Squad confront the Tribunal Prime, after which Pollux and Ternion - who, by now, have had enough of the Tribunal Prime's abuse of his power - declare the Tribunal Prime to be guilty of multiple crimes, including corruption. After a brief scuffle with Superman and his friends, the Tribunal Prime goes to leave the planet, but as he is now technically a convict, this is construed as escape, so Pollux and Ternion order him to be shot and killed.

Pollux and Ternion still consider Superman guilty; however, now free of the Tribunal Prime's bias, they revoke Superman's death sentence; instead, they sentence him to a life of atonement for his "crime", noting that since he has engaged himself in a never-ending battle for truth and justice, they order him to continue that battle, which he gladly agrees to do, understanding the spirit of the sentence. They are not so lenient on the Cyborg, however; his death sentence still stands, but as he is mostly indestructible, Pollux and Ternion carry out that sentence by teleporting him into the event horizon of a black hole, intending to imprison him within it forever. Superman and his friends then return home to a welcoming Earth.

List of "The Trial of Superman!" stories in chronological order

Prologue
 Superman: The Man of Tomorrow #2 (fall 1995):  "Pawns"  (1995: 41);
 Action Comics #715 (November 1995):  "Doc Parasite!"  (1995: 42).

Main story
 Superman: The Man of Steel #50 (November 1995):  "Split Personality"  (1995: 43);
 Superman (vol. 2) #106 (November 1995) (no title) (1995: 44);
 The Adventures of Superman #529 (November 1995):  "Jail Break!"  (1995: 45);
 Action Comics #716 (December 1995):  "Fugitive Justice!"  (1995: 46);
 Superman: The Man of Steel #51 (December 1995):  "Wanted"  (1995: 47);
 Superman (vol. 2) #107 (December 1995):  "Bottled Up!" * (1995: 48); 
 Steel (vol. 2) #22 (December 1995):  "Deliverance!" ;
 The Adventures of Superman #530 (December 1995):  "Different Demons" * (1995: 49); 
 Superman: The Man of Tomorrow #3 (winter 1995):  "Fighting Back" * (1995: 50); 
 Action Comics #717 (January 1996):  "H'Tros City!"  (1996: 1);
 Superman: The Man of Steel #52 (January 1996):  "Crime and Punishment"  (1996: 2);
 Superman (vol. 2) #108 (January 1996):  "No Escape!"  (1996: 3);
 The Adventures of Superman #531 (January 1996):  "Justice!"  (1996: 4).

*also a tie-in issue of Underworld Unleashed

Other information
 "The Trial of Superman!" took place at the same time as the DC Comics crossover event Underworld Unleashed, thus explaining Superman's absence from that event.
 Lex Luthor is revealed to be the one behind the Parasite II's rampage in the beginning of the story arc and he also reveals that he has made a deal with someone in order to be restored to full health and vitality, thus indirectly referring to the crossover event mentioned above.

Collected editions
The crossover story arc was later collected as Superman: The Trial of Superman trade paperback (DC Comics, November 1997, 257 pages).

References

Comics by Dan Jurgens
Comics by Louise Simonson